Ashwin Vasan (born November 15, 1980) is an American physician and epidemiologist serving as the 44th commissioner of the New York City Department of Health and Mental Hygiene. Vasan is also a public health professor and practicing primary care doctor at Columbia University, and was most recently the president and CEO of Fountain House, a national mental health nonprofit.

Education 
Vasan earned a Bachelor of Arts in Economics from the University of California, Los Angeles in 2001, a Master of Science from the Harvard School of Public Health in 2004. He graduated from University of Michigan Medical School in 2011 and completed a PhD from the London School of Hygiene & Tropical Medicine in 2015.

Career 
Ashwin Vasan started his career in global health, working on HIV/AIDS, specifically, access to antiretroviral therapy in the developing world. He worked with Partners In Health in Boston, before moving to the Department of HIV/AIDS at the World Health Organization, where he worked on the “3by5” Initiative, under Dr Jim Yong Kim, to expand access to HIV treatment, spending time in Switzerland, rural Uganda, Lesotho and Rwanda with PIH once again.  After completing his internal medicine training at NewYork-Presbyterian Hospital, in 2014 Vasan joined the faculty of the Columbia University Mailman School of Public Health, and the Department of Medicine at Columbia’s Vagelos College of Physicians & Surgeons, where he works as an assistant professor of clinical population and family health and medicine. Vasan practices primary care medicine at Columbia University Irving Medical Center.

In 2016, Vasan was appointed to serve as the founding executive director of the New York City Department of Health and Mental Hygiene's Health Access Equity Unit, a city-wide initiative aimed at improving the health and social welfare of marginalized communities in New York City.

In 2019, Vasan was named president and CEO of Fountain House, a national mental health nonprofit that provides employment, education, housing, health and wellness programs to the mentally ill. Fountain House is notable for creating the Clubhouse model of psychosocial rehabilitation, which has been replicated in over 300 locations in 30 countries. During his tenure, Vasan grew the organization from a local New York-based nonprofit to a national organization, supporting eight markets, and establishing a policy office based in Washington, DC, working on mental health reform, including funding for community based mental health systems, and mental health crisis response. During his tenure the organization nearly doubled in revenue including transformative new gifts from MacKenzie Scott and the Ford Foundation, amongst others.

As Commissioner, Vasan has led an ambitious re-envisioning of the Department and the City’s public health planning, focusing on stopping and reversing declines in life expectancy in NYC. In doing so he has centered mental health (focusing on youth, SMI, and overdoses) in the agenda and restructured the Agency around 4 other key strategic priorities and contributors to declining life expectancy (chronic diseases, women’s health and birth equity, violence prevention, and climate change), while shifting the agency culture and process towards response readiness and managing health emergencies, including infectious diseases. 

Vasan began his tenure toward the tail end of the Omicron wave of COVID-19, during which he served as the Senior Public Health Advisor in City Hall. Early in his tenure as Commissioner, Vasan faced protests over COVID-19 related mandates and restrictions. On the evening of April 4, 2022, around two dozen protesters carrying anti-Joe Biden flags and anti-COVID-19 vaccine mandate posters assembled around Vasan's house in Brooklyn. The protesters chanted "We! The People! Will Not Comply!". A group of the protesters later climbed the front steps of his house, banged on the front door, and screamed racial epithets and death threats. One of the protesters was carrying a hammer. Vasan was not home at the time, but his wife and two younger children were. The April 4 protest occurred after Vasan consulted with New York City Mayor Eric Adams, which resulted in New York City delaying the removal of COVID-19 mask mandates for schoolchildren under the age of 5, citing rising cases of COVID-19. During another protest, one of the protesters was carrying a baseball bat. The protests have resulted in Vasan needing daily police protection from the New York City Police Department (NYPD). Despite this protection, protesters still occasionally show up at Vasan's house.

Vasan led the City’s response to the MPOX outbreak in summer 2022, with the city being the epicenter of the North American outbreak. The Health Department and the City were the first in the nation to launch MPOX vaccination clinics in June 2022x for “extended Pre-Exposure Prophylaxis”, doing so under extreme national vaccine supply constraints. These clinics, and the City’s response in partnership with community leaders, advocates, and providers, led the nation and pushed the federal administration to launch a national MPOX response and vaccination strategy just a few weeks later in early July 2022.

Under Vasan’s leadership the Department has also led an innovative response to reproductive health after the Supreme Court’s ruling in the Dobbs case, launching the nation’s first public sector Abortion Access Hub, where people from all across the U.S. and especially in states in new restrictions on abortion, can call and be navigated and supported to attain necessary reproductive health and abortion care in New York City. 

Vasan has been quoted as a public health and mental health expert in national and international publications including CNN, The New York Times, NPR, CBS News, USA Today, The Guardian, Forbes, WNYC, Al Jazeera, today.com, and Insider.

Vasan was also a member of the City & State advisory board until assuming his current role as NYC Health Commissioner. He has also served on the boards of Transportation Alternatives, inseparable, and Forward Majority. He has worked on multiple local, state, and national political campaigns as a health policy advisor.

Personal life 
Vasan lives in Brooklyn with his wife and three kids.

See also 
 Indian Americans in New York City

References 

Commissioners of Health of the City of New York
Columbia University Mailman School of Public Health faculty
University of California, Los Angeles alumni
Harvard School of Public Health alumni
University of Michigan Medical School alumni
Alumni of the London School of Hygiene & Tropical Medicine
Living people
1980 births
American physicians of Indian descent